Black Lion Crossing Halt railway station served the town of Aberdare, in the historical county of Glamorganshire, Wales, from 1906 to 1924 on the Vale of Neath Railway.

History 
The station was opened on 1 January 1906 by the Great Western Railway. It closed on 22 September 1924.

References 

Disused railway stations in Rhondda Cynon Taf
Former Great Western Railway stations
Railway stations in Great Britain opened in 1906
Railway stations in Great Britain closed in 1924
1906 establishments in Wales